Pires is a Portuguese surname.

Pires may also refer to:

Autódromo Fernanda Pires da Silva, race course in Estoril, Portugal
Music from Van-Pires, John Entwistle's last studio solo album
Pires (Monção), a village in Monção, Portugal
Pires do Rio Microregion, a region of south-central Goiás state, Brazil
Pires do Rio, municipality in Goiás state, Brazil
Ribeirão Pires, a municipality in the state of São Paulo, Brazil
Pires (Portuguese footballer) (born 1931), Portuguese football defender
Pires (Brazilian footballer) (born 1956), Brazilian football defensive midfielder